The First Secretary of the Central Committee of the Communist Party of Cuba is the de facto leader of Cuba. The First Secretary is the highest office within the Communist Party of Cuba as well as ranking first in the Politburo, the highest decision-making body in Cuba, which makes the office holder the most powerful person in the Cuban government. In communist states the First or General Secretary of the Communist Party is typically the de facto leader of the country and a more powerful position than state offices such as President (head of state) or Prime Minister (head of government), when those positions are held by different individuals. From 1961 until 2011, the position of First Secretary was held by Fidel Castro, who was Prime Minister of Cuba and, until 2008, President of the Council of State. Miguel Díaz-Canel, who has been President of Cuba since 2019, was elected First Secretary of the Communist Party on 19 April 2021, succeeding Raúl Castro, who was First Secretary from 2011 until 2021. The post was named in imitation of the title of First Secretary of the Communist Party of the Soviet Union, which was used by Nikita Khrushchev and, briefly, Leonid Brezhnev.

Officeholders

See also
List of political parties in Cuba
Politburo of the Communist Party of Cuba
Secretariat of the Communist Party of Cuba
President of Cuba
Prime Minister of Cuba
Cuba under Fidel Castro

References 

 
Communist Party of Cuba
Government of Cuba
Leaders of political parties in Cuba